Axel Cristóbal Jodorowsky (24 July 1965 – 15 September 2022), also known as Cristóbal Jodorowsky, was a Mexican-French actor, writer, painter, playwright, trainer, and tarologist. He was the son of the Chilean-French film and theater director Alejandro Jodorowsky and French  actress Valérie Trumblay, brother to Brontis Jodorowsky and Adán Jodorowsky, and the uncle of Alma Jodorowsky.

Axel was best known for his performance as Fenix in his father's 1989 avant-garde horror film Santa Sangre for which he was nominated for the Saturn Award for Best Actor and the documentary about psychoshamanism Quantum Men directed by Carlos Serrano Azcona.

References

External links 

1965 births
2022 deaths
Mexican male film actors
Mexican people of Ukrainian-Jewish descent
Mexican people of Chilean descent
Male actors from Mexico City